HLA-B5 (B5) is an HLA-B serotype. B5 is a broad antigen serotype that recognizes the B51 and B52 split antigen serotypes.

Serotype

References

0